Johanne Christiane Borchgrevink (1836–1924) was a Norwegian missionary and educator. In 1872 she founded Antsahamanitra Boarding School for Girls in Antananarivo, Madagascar.

References

1836 births
1924 deaths
Norwegian missionaries
Norwegian educators
Missionary educators
Christian missionaries in Madagascar